Senator Hare may refer to:

William D. Hare (1834–1910), Oregon State Senate
William G. Hare (1882–1971), Oregon State Senate